The 1938 Navy Midshipmen football team represented the United States Naval Academy during the 1938 college football season. In their second season under head coach Hank Hardwick, the Midshipmen compiled a 4–3–2 record and outscored their opponents by a combined score of 126 to 60.

Schedule

References

Navy
Navy Midshipmen football seasons
Navy Midshipmen football